William Russell Blailock, Jr. (1902-1972) was an American football player in the National Football League. He first played with the Milwaukee Badgers during the 1923 NFL season. After a year away from the NFL, he played with the Akron Pros during the 1925 NFL season. He died of a heart attack in 1972.

References

External links

Players of American football from Texas
Milwaukee Badgers players
Akron Pros players
Baylor Bears football players
1902 births
1972 deaths